Ashwin Joshi is an Indian politician and member of the Indian National Congress. Joshi was a member of the Madhya Pradesh Legislative Assembly from the Indore-3 constituency in Indore district. He represented the constituency for three consecutive terms from 1998 to 2013. He is the nephew of veteran Congress leader Mahesh Joshi, who also represented Indore-3 (Vidhan Sabha constituency) from 1980 to 1990. He is well known for his poetic style speeches.

Political career
He enrolled in politics from student life. He served as president of Holkar Science College for two consecutive years (1980-1981 & 1981-1982). Afterwards, in 1982-1983 he held position of secretary at Devi Ahilya Vishwavidyalaya, Indore. He then held positions at Madhya Pradesh youth Congress and Indore city Congress Committee. He then got elected as MLA for three consecutive terms from Indore-3 constituency in between 1998 and 2013.

See also
Madhya Pradesh Legislative Assembly
2013 Madhya Pradesh Legislative Assembly election
2008 Madhya Pradesh Legislative Assembly election
2003 Madhya Pradesh Legislative Assembly election
1998 Madhya Pradesh Legislative Assembly election

External links

References 

Politicians from Indore
Indian National Congress politicians from Madhya Pradesh
Madhya Pradesh MLAs 1998–2003
Madhya Pradesh MLAs 2003–2008
Madhya Pradesh MLAs 2008–2013
Living people
1960 births